XHSIL-FM is a radio station on 99.9 FM in Siltepec, Chiapas. It is part of the state-owned Radio Chiapas state network.

Radio Siltepec, La Señal de la Sierra
Prior to the establishment of a properly licensed radio station, the Chiapas state network established a pirate station in Siltepec, known as Radio Siltepec, La Señal de la Sierra. This station signed on August 2, 2012, on 102.5 MHz and was officially acknowledged by the state network for years despite not holding a concession.

History with concession
On February 22, 2017, the IFT awarded a public concession for the Chiapas state network to build a properly licensed station in Siltepec, with callsign XHSIL-FM and broadcasting on a frequency of 99.9 MHz.

References

Radio stations in Chiapas
Public radio in Mexico
2017 establishments in Mexico